This is a sorted by release date and name list of Games for Windows – Live titles; 73 (including released and former) video games under Microsoft's Games for Windows – Live platform, which include online gaming features. Two common features in all listed games are friends and achievements. With the closure of the Games for Windows Marketplace, none of these games are available for purchase on demand from that store anymore, but the client software and the servers are still available.

Games

Former games
Note: The retail disc and Games on Demand versions of these games still require Games for Windows – Live.

See also

Games for Windows
Games for Windows – Live
List of Games for Windows titles
List of Windows Games on Demand
Live Anywhere

Notes

References

External links
 Official Games for Windows – Live website
 Games for Windows Marketplace website on Xbox.com

 
Video game lists by technology or feature
Windows Games for Windows